Currie is a city in Murray County, Minnesota, United States. The population was 233 at the 2010 census. Lake Shetek State Park is nearby. The city is known as the "Gateway to Lake Shetek". Currie is notable for its tourism, cuisine, and recreational opportunities. It is home to Lakeside Hideaway and the End-O-Line Railroad Park & Museum in addition to being the headquarters of Schmitz Grain. Along with the census-designated area The Lakes, Minnesota, the Currie area has a population of close to 1,000 residents.

Geography

Minnesota State Highway 30 and Murray County Road 38 are the main routes in the community.  U.S. Highway 59 is nearby.

Demographics

2010 census
As of the census of 2010, there were 233 people, 114 households, and 65 families residing in the city. The racial makeup of the city was 100.0% White. Hispanic or Latino of any race were 1.7% of the population.

There were 114 households, of which 19.3% had children under the age of 18 living with them, 44.7% were married couples living together, 8.8% had a female householder with no husband present, 3.5% had a male householder with no wife present, and 43.0% were non-families. 38.6% of all households were made up of individuals, and 16.7% had someone living alone who was 65 years of age or older. The average household size was 2.04 and the average family size was 2.68.

The median age in the city was 53.3 years. 16.3% of residents were under the age of 18; 6% were between the ages of 18 and 24; 15.5% were from 25 to 44; 34.4% were from 45 to 64; and 27.9% were 65 years of age or older. The gender makeup of the city was 50.6% male and 49.4% female.

2000 census
As of the census of 2000, there were 225 people, 109 households, and 67 families residing in the city. The racial makeup of the city was 99.56% White, and 0.44% from two or more races. Hispanic or Latino of any race were 0.89% of the population.

There were 109 households, out of which 18.3% had children under the age of 18 living with them, 49.5% were married couples living together, 8.3% had a female householder with no husband present, and 38.5% were non-families. 33.9% of all households were made up of individuals, and 16.5% had someone living alone who was 65 years of age or older.  The average household size was 2.06 and the average family size was 2.63.

In the city, the population was spread out, with 19.6% under the age of 18, 4.4% from 18 to 24, 18.7% from 25 to 44, 28.0% from 45 to 64, and 29.3% who were 65 years of age or older.  The median age was 49 years. For every 100 females, there were 90.7 males.  For every 100 females age 18 and over, there were 84.7 males.

The median income for a household in the city was $22,857, and the median income for a family was $34,821. Males had a median income of $22,500 versus $18,750 for females. The per capita income for the city was $15,767.  About 7.3% of families and 12.2% of the population were below the poverty line, including 25.0% of those under the age of eighteen and 8.3% of those 65 or over.

History
Currie was laid out in 1872 around a gristmill built by Neil and Archibald Currie. A post office has been in operation at Currie since 1874.

End-O-Line Railroad Park & Museum

End-O-Line Park is nestled on the northern edge of Currie. Founded in 1872 by Neil and Archibald Currie, this place was thought to be the most beautiful country with the Des Moines River moving across the prairie and Lake Shetek in the west. The park is located along Murray County Road 38 near Minnesota Highway 30.

The railroads were the first great achievement in transportation of the machine age. This achievement led to the expansion and growth of the West. It is this story, as well as the story of the area, which the museum is trying to tell.

A model railroad display, in HO scale, is one of the highlights of the museum. This display is an authentic reproduction of the Currie railroad yards as they were around the turn of the 20th century. The layout features scratch-built locomotives and structures, complete landscaping, a full wrap-around mural, complete sound effects and more. Visitors can hear the old steam locomotive puff and chug throughout the countryside, which is accented by the steam whistle, bell and hiss of steam.

District Number One, the Sunrise School, was moved to End-O-Line Park and restored by the Murray County Historical Society. The embossed tin ceilings and walls, vertical wainscoting, recitation bench and many blackboards are typical, but the triangular sunrise worked into the front and back of the schoolhouse are unique. The little one-room school with tin dinner pails, water cooler, wash basin, old world maps, bell tower and rope, ink wells and cloakrooms, will bring back fond memories to share with children.

End-O-Line Park's section house, originally located in Comfrey, was built by Chicago and Northwestern for a section foreman and his family. A saltbox structure, the house has been restored to the early 1900 style.

Recreation
Currie has many outdoor activities available to the general public. These include the seven-mile bike trail that goes through  Lake Shetek State Park, Lake Shetek, and local farmland. The Shetek Lake is located just north of town, and a popular vacation destination for people from all over Southwest Minnesota. The lake has a population of approximately 600, and more during the summer months. The area of Currie/Lake Shetek has a combined population of almost 1,000 residents during the summer months.

References

External links
 Currie Community Guide
 End O Line Railroad Park & Museum

Cities in Minnesota
Cities in Murray County, Minnesota